Ralfs Sirmacis is a rally driver from Latvia, and is the winner of multiple European Rally Championship events.

ERC results

ERC Junior results

References

External links
Profile on ewrc-results.com

1994 births
Living people
European Rally Championship drivers
Latvian rally drivers